Olga Celeste (April 9, 1888 – August 31, 1969) trained leopards and pumas for performance in circuses, vaudeville and film. She starred in very early animal films for Selig Polyscope, and was said to have handled animals for 1,000 films, including the leopard in the Katharine Hepburn film Bringing Up Baby.

Biography 
Olga Celeste was born in Sweden; her father was a horse trainer. According to the Los Angeles Times she ran away at 11 to join a Swedish circus, but eventually returned home. Another report said that she ran away to train horses and after several days her parents found her living in barn and sleeping in a manger. Olga was the youngest of seven siblings and the only naughty one. Her older sisters and brothers were all well-behaved and disappeared through life and into the coffin without anyone taking much notice of them." One 16-year-old Olga Cecelia Knutson of Lund, Skåne Län departed Mälmo for Chicago on April 15, 1904. She took the ship  from Liverpool to Boston, arriving April 30; her contact in the U.S. was her sister Edith Knutson of Chicago. According to Frank Buck, Princess Celeste ran away at age 14 or 15 to join a circus operating in Chicago's Riverside Park.  

Her start in show business supposedly came in 1904 when she lived with her older sister in Chicago. She was hired by Big Otto Breitkreutz and was taught how to run a dog and pony show. According to other accounts she was game to work with horses when the regular trainer was injured and that launched her career. Big Otto's operation was acquired by film producer William Selig and she continued on as a "lion tamer" for that outfit. Around 1908 she appeared opposite Charles B. Murphy in a  motion picture short called The Lion's Bride. It was reportedly premiered in Riverview Park and caused a sensation. Murphy and Olga Celeste were married around 1910 but later divorced; the couple had no children. She was occasionally credited as Olga Celeste Murphy during the teens. Olga Celeste also starred in Selig's 1909  (directed by Francis Boggs), and worked as a stunt double for Kathlyn Williams in Selig's groundbreaking serial The Adventures of Kathlyn. 

At Selig Zoo, Olga Celeste hosted leopard tea parties on Sundays. Apparently Olga Celeste "called her leopards her babies and adored them precisely because, as she said, they were 'the most treacherous' of animals. Frequently dressed to resemble her leopards, Olga serves as an access point to another world if only because her animals have turned her into something 'other' even outside the realm of fiction." In 1923 Mlle. Celeste took her leopard act to Aloha Park in Hawaii. She also did stints with John Robinson Circus, Al G. Barnes Circus and Ringling Brothers. 

In the time of the 1930 census, Olga Celeste was living in a rental near Lincoln Park, Los Angeles. She reported her age at first marriage as 14. She reported that she had first come to the United States in 1907 and was now a naturalized citizen. Following the success of a hit 1933 Clyde Beatty picture, she was hired to appear as one of the trainers in Taming the Jungle. In 1938 she was the leopard trainer for Bringing Up Baby. When Zoopark shut down in 1940 she was the last original employee of what had once been Selig's Wild Animal Farm, and she borrowed money (including, reportedly, from friends like boxer Jack Dempsey and Tarzan actor Johnny Weissmuller) to buy five leopards and three lions that she did not want sold to strangers. The last of these cats died in 1954.

After she retired, Olga Celeste lived out her days in Burbank. She died in 1969 and was buried on September 8 in the same grave as life partner Emma Bell Clifford at Evergreen Park Memorial Cemetery. She was survived by nieces and nephews in the American Midwest and Sweden. Olga Celeste rarely, if ever, used her legal last name Knutson. She went by a number of stage names including Princess Olga, Princess Celeste, Princess Cecilia, Madame Olga, Mademoiselle Celeste, et al. She was also known as the Leopard Lady.

See also
 Irina Bugrimova, Soviet lion tamer
 Mabel Stark, American tiger trainer
 Ephraim Thompson, American elephant trainer

Notes

References

Further reading

External link
 1910: Princess Bonita, Queen of the leopards. Big Otto's Trained Wild Animals

1888 births
1969 deaths
Animal trainers
American circus performers
Vaudeville performers
Lion tamers
Women stunt performers
American silent film actresses
People from Lund
People from Burbank, California
Swedish emigrants to the United States